Jeffrey S. Kubenka (born August 24, 1974) was a Major League Baseball left-handed pitcher.  He is an alumnus of St. Mary's University, Texas.

Drafted by the Los Angeles Dodgers in the 38th round of the 1996 MLB amateur draft, Kubenka would make his Major League Baseball debut with the Los Angeles Dodgers on September 6, 1998, and play in his final game on August 8, 1999.

A single in his only at-bat left Kubenka with a rare MLB career batting average of 1.000.

External links

1974 births
Living people
Baseball players from Texas
Major League Baseball pitchers
Los Angeles Dodgers players
American expatriate baseball players in Japan
Chiba Lotte Marines players
St. Mary's Rattlers baseball players
Yakima Bears players
San Bernardino Stampede players
Albuquerque Dukes players
San Antonio Missions players
Sacramento River Cats players
Tucson Sidewinders players
People from Weimar, Texas